Keren Mor (born March 18, 1964) is an Israeli actress and comedian.

Biography
During her mandatory military service in the IDF,  Mor studied acting at the Nissan Nativ Acting Studio in Tel Aviv. Mor is married to the Israeli actor Menashe Noy. The couple have two children.

Mor's first major film appearance was in  "Abba Ganuv" (1987). Later she appeared in  Amos Gitai's  "Berlin-Yerushalaim" (1989) and "Shuroo" (1991). In 1992 she was in the short film Marak Off with Hagit Dasberg, and in "Kvalim" (1992) with Arik Einstein and Moni Moshonov.

Mor's television career began with her appearance on the Israeli comedy shows "HaOlam HaErev" and "Zehu Ze!" In 1993, she was joined Shai Avivi, Dov Navon, Rami Heuberger and Menashe Noy in the Israeli sketch series "Hahamishia Hakamerit". The show was broadcast between 1993-1997. In 1996, she appeared in the film "Klavim Lo Novhim Beyarok."

In 1997 Mor played in Menashe Noy's film "1812 Overture" with Ami Smolartchik and in "Bip" together with Dafna Rechter. In 1998 Mor participated in Noy's second film "trend" and in Amos Gitai's film "Yom yom" together with Hanna Maron and Dalit Kahan.

In 2000, Mor appeared in the Israeli drama television series "Ha-Burganim" in which she played with the original cast of "Hahamishia Hakamerit". The show was broadcast between 2000-2005. During that time Mor appeared in the TV short film "Bchora" with Dan Toren.

In 2004, Mor played in Joseph Pichhadze's film "Year Zero". That year she appeared in the TV Sketch series "Ktzarim" alongside Moni Moshonov and Yuval Segal. In 2005 Mor also participated in the film "Joy" together with Tal Friedman. In 2006 Mor starred with Ronit Elkabetz and Menashe Noy in the TV series "Parashat Ha-Shavua". In 2008 she appeared in Shlomi and Ronit Elkabetz's film "Shiva".

She currently co-stars in the TV series "Checkout" (Koopah Rohsheet).

Mor also works in theater.

Selected filmography 
 Abba Ganuv - 1987
 Abba Ganuv II - 1989
 Berlin-Yerushalaim - 1989
 The Lookout - 1990
 Kvalim - 1992
 Hahamishia Hakamerit - 1993-1997
 Klavim Lo Novhim Beyarok - 1996
 Overture 1812 - 1997
 Yom Yom - 1998
 Ha-Burganim - 2000-2005
 Year Zero - 2004
 Ktzarim - 2004-2009
 Joy - 2005
 Foul Gesture - 2006
 Shiva - 2008
 Caramel - 2009

References

External links
 

1964 births
Living people
Israeli Jews
Israeli film actresses
Israeli television actresses
Jewish Israeli actresses
20th-century Israeli actresses
21st-century Israeli actresses
Actresses from Tel Aviv